StarTropics is a 1990 action-adventure video game developed and published by Nintendo for the Nintendo Entertainment System. Unlike most of Nintendo's games, it was never released or intended to be released in Japan. It was released only in North America and Europe. It was produced, written and directed by Genyo Takeda of Nintendo Integrated Research & Development (who also developed the Punch-Out!! series). StarTropics was followed by a sequel titled Zoda's Revenge: StarTropics II, released in 1994.

StarTropics was released on the Wii Virtual Console on January 7, 2008, in North America and on January 11, 2008, in the PAL regions; it was released via the Wii U Virtual Console in Europe on September 3, 2015, in Australia on September 4, 2015, and in North America on May 26, 2016. On November 11, 2016, the game (alongside 29 other games) was included in the NES Classic Edition / Nintendo Classic Mini: Nintendo Entertainment System released by Nintendo.

Plot

The story of the game follows 15-year-old Mike Jones, a high school baseball team captain from Seattle, as he travels to visit his uncle, an archaeologist by the name of Dr. Steven Jones, at his laboratory on the fictional C-Island in the South Seas. When Mike arrives at Dr. Jones's home in the tropical village of Coralcola, he finds that his uncle has gone missing. The chief of Coralcola gives Mike a special yo-yo to defend himself, and Dr. Jones's robot Nav-Com permits Mike to use his uncle's submarine to search for him. On a nearby island, Mike finds a bottle with a message from Dr. Jones, stating that he has been abducted by extraterrestrials. Traveling to many of the isles of the South Seas, Mike encounters monsters, labyrinths, quirky characters, and intelligent animals, including a talking parrot and a mother dolphin looking for her son, all in the search for his lost uncle.

Eventually, Mike and the submarine are swallowed by a whale.  In the belly of the whale, Mike encounters his uncle's assistant, who confirms that Dr. Jones was abducted by aliens, and out of fear, he did not give Mike all possible help when they met earlier on C-island.  After they escape the whale, the assistant gives Mike a special code, which enables Nav-Com to track Dr. Jones's location. Mike follows the signal to the lost ruins which includes the melted wreckage of an alien escape pod. Shortly afterward, Mike finds his uncle. Dr. Jones explains that he discovered the escape pod some time ago, and says it came from a far-away planet called Argonia. This escape pod contained three magic cubes, which are now in the hands of the evil aliens' leader Zoda.

Infiltrating their spaceship, Mike recovers the three cubes and confronts Zoda. Mike defeats Zoda and then escapes as the spaceship self-destructs. After Mike returns to C-Island, the cubes are placed together and a small group of children appear. The leader of the children, Mica, explains that they are the last of the Argonians (their home planet having been destroyed) and that her father King Hirocon sent them to Earth to live in peace. The village chief invites the children to live with them in Coralcola, to which they accept.

Gameplay
StarTropics is played from a 2D, top-down perspective, similar to many other role-playing games of that era. The game is divided into several chapters; in each chapter, players take control of the protagonist, "Mike,"  exploring various settlements and other areas of interest and interacting with non-player characters in order to obtain more information about the surroundings. The player is then usually tasked with locating the source of some local calamity or disturbance. When the player enters a more dangerous locale, the game switches mechanics, bringing the view closer in and introducing various obstacles and adversaries that the player must either navigate or destroy.

A yo-yo serves as Mike's primary weapon (renamed "star" in the Virtual Console release). As the player progresses, other weapons and tools are made available that will aid in Mike's journey, including several items influenced by American baseball.

The game was also packaged with a physical letter, which set up the story and was used within the game's plot. During gameplay, the player is prompted to dip this physical letter in water to reveal a hidden code (747), which is required to progress in the game. In response to questions from fans, the code was also published in Nintendo Power. In the Wii Virtual Console release, the letter was added to the manual, which instead plays an animation of the letter being dipped in water before revealing the code. The Wii U Virtual Console release replaced this with an explanation in the manual that the original release required players to dip an insert-letter in water, followed by an image of the submerged letter. However, the Nintendo Switch release does not include any digital alternative to the letter, and thus does not provide any legitimate way for a player to complete the puzzle.

Reception 

AllGames Christopher Michael Baker found the game to be derivative of The Legend of Zelda, but still "very much an excellent game". Michael Baker commented on the graphics, noting that the characters and action sequences "look fantastic" while the travel scenes were "kind of dull". IGNs Lucas M. Thomas praised the creative gameplay of StarTropics, calling it "the natural evolution of the original Legend of Zelda."

In the September 1997 issue, Nintendo Power had 12 staff members vote in a list for the top 100 games of all time.  The magazine placed StarTropics at 64th place on their list.

References

External links
Virtual Console web page (North American ) (European)

Hardcore Gaming 101 article on the StarTropics games

1990 video games
Action-adventure games
Nintendo Entertainment System games
Nintendo Integrated Research and Development games
Science fantasy video games
Virtual Console games
Virtual Console games for Wii U
Nintendo games
Video games developed in Japan
Video games set in Oceania
Video games set on fictional islands
Nintendo Switch Online games